Philostratus the Younger (fl. 3rd century AD), also known as Philostratus of Lemnos, was a Greek sophist of the Roman imperial period. He was author of the second series of Imagines, which does not survive completely; in the preface, he praises his mother's father, who wrote the first series of Imagines; this is presumably the author more commonly referred to as Philostratus of Lemnos, who himself was the son-in-law of the famous sophist Philostratus of Athens. The dating of this work, the only known activity of its author, varies between 250 and 300 AD; if the earlier date is correct, this Philostratus may well be the same man who was archon of Athens in 255 AD.

Notes

References
Côté, Dominique. "La figure d'Eschine dans les Vies des sophistes de Philostrate", Cahiers des études anciennes 42 (2005), p. 389-420.
Côté, Dominique. "Les deux sophistiques de Philostrate", Rhetorica 24 (2006), 1-35.

External links

Livius, Philostratus Updates the preceding article with some ninety years of more recent research.
Online Text: Philostratus IV, Imagines translated by Arthur Fairbanks
Flavii Philostrati opera, C. L. Kayser (edit.), 2 voll., Lipsiae, in aedibus B. G. Teubneri, 1870–71, vol. 2 pp. 390-420.
Philostratus: Imagines. Callistratus: Descriptiones, Arthur Fairbanks (edit.), London: William Heinemann LTD, New York: G. P. Putnam's Sons, 1931, pp. 281-368.
Philostrati minoris imagines et Callistrati descriptiones, C. Shenkl - A. Reisch (ed.), Lipsiae, in aedibus B. G. Teubneri, 1902.
Philostratorum et Callistrati opera, Eunapii vitae sophistarum, Himerii sophistae declamationes, A. Westermann, Jo. Fr. Boissoade, Fr. Dübner (ed.), Parisiis, editore Ambrosio Firmin Didot, 1849, pp. 397-413.

Roman-era Sophists
Roman-era philosophers in Athens
Roman-era Athenian rhetoricians